Danin Talović (Serbian Cyrillic: Данин Таловић; born 8 March 1995) is a Montenegrin professional footballer who plays as an attacking midfielder for Montenegrin First League club Rudar Pljevlja.

Honours

Clubs
Rudar Pljevlja
 Montenegrin First League: 2014–15

References

External links
Danin Talovic at Soccerway

1995 births
Living people
Association football midfielders
Montenegrin footballers
Montenegrin expatriate footballers
Montenegrin First League players
Montenegrin Second League players
Football Superleague of Kosovo players
Liga 1 (Indonesia) players
FK Rudar Pljevlja players
FK Jezero players
FK Berane players
FK Lovćen players
KF Flamurtari players
FK Ibar Rožaje players
Persikabo 1973 players
Expatriate footballers in Kosovo
Expatriate footballers in Indonesia
Montenegrin expatriate sportspeople in Kosovo
Montenegrin expatriate sportspeople in Indonesia